Nakhakshathangal is a 1986 Indian Malayalam-language film directed by Hariharan, written by M. T. Vasudevan Nair and starring Monisha, Vineeth and Saleema. Monisha, won the National Film Award for Best Actress for her role, making her the youngest actress to achieve the feat. The film was a blockbuster, and is more noted for its songs. It was remade in Tamil as Pookkal Vidum Thudhu.

Plot 
The story is about Ramu (Vineeth), a 16-year-old boy who is staying with his annoying uncle, who gets angry and often treats Ramu like a slave. On a trip to the pilgrimage town of Guruvayoor with his uncle (played by Thilakan), Ramu meets 15-year-old Gowri (Monisha), who has come with her grandmother. Both find love, and after sharing a few tender talks and moments, depart without a clue that they will meet again. When back Ramu runs away from his uncle and lands up in the city with his neighbor Namboothiri (played by Jayachandran). As fate would have it, Ramu and Gowri meet again. Good conduct and intelligence of Ramu gets noticed and he is asked by a lawyer to stay in the house, where Gowri is a maid. The lawyer's deaf and dumb daughter Lakshmi (Saleema) gets attracted to Ramu and the lawyer fixes the marriage without asking Ramu.

Gowri becomes Lakshmi’s maid and she tries to force Ramu to fall in love with her, but Ramu is still in love with Gowri but Ramu starts to like Lakshmi and they became good friends with each other. Lakshmi feels a ray of happiness as she has someone to live with forever. Lakshmi and Gowri become good friends with each other with Gowri to support her relationship with Ramu. One day, Lakshmi’s grandmother falls ill and wants the lawyer to promise that he and Lakshmi will not make Ramu disappointed with his relationship with Lakshmi.

Lakshmi is now a bit arrogant to Gowri about her relationship with Ramu as she does not want Gowri to interfere in their relationship but Gowri wants to stay with Ramu as she loves him very much. Lakshmi angered at her response, slaps her and Gowri burst into tears and runs away. Gowri runs to Ramu upset by what happened and he too was upset at how she treated Gowri and the arrangements of him marrying Lakshmi. But Lakshmi spies on them embracing each other in sadness without them knowing, and she is so infuriated by the fact that Ramu loves Gowri more than her and she begins to destroy some of the things in her room and she was very sad and she begins to cry on her bed in her room. But Gowri came into her room and see what she destroys and she finds a note on her desk saying that "Lakshmi is a fool".

Ramu finally tells the lawyer that he didn’t like his arrangement for him to marry Lakshmi. The lawyer is very sad and he tells him that Lakshmi really loves him. But he really loves Gowri and soon Ramu becomes very depressed. Lakshmi is really sad and soon she is ashamed because of her actions toward Gowri.

Lakshmi goes and sits on the steps near a waterhole where she saw Gowri washing some clothes. Both of them stared at each other for a little bit, Lakshmi walked to Gowri. But Gowri was reluctant to look at her, but she turned anyway and Lakshmi apologised for being mean to Gowri. Gowri forgave her and she embraced Lakshmi and Lakshmi cried in her arms. Lakshmi wrote on one of the walls saying that don't hate her and Gowri was in deep sadness. She tells that she will make Ramu agree to marry Lakshmi and she doesn't want a life by hurting Lakshmi. They both look for Ramu but he wasn't in his room. Lakshmi found a note on her desk and she read it. It was really a suicide note from Ramu and that he committed suicide by getting run over by a train. Lakshmi was shocked and saddened by the loss of Ramu. She gave the note to Gowri, and she was really upset by Ramu’s death and they both mourned the loss of Ramu outside Lakshmi’s house looking at each other for support.

Cast 
Monisha as Gowri (dubbed by Ambili(Dubbing artist))
Vineeth as Ramu (dubbed by Krishnachandra)
Saleema as Lakshmi(dubbed by Bhagyalakshmi)
Thilakan as Uncle
Kaviyoor Ponnamma
Jayachandran as Neighbor Namboothiri
Jagannatha Varma as Advocate Nair
Kuthiravattam Pappu as Cook
Bahadoor

Soundtrack 

The songs became even more popular than the film, and are still popular. K. S. Chithra got her second National Film Award for Best Female Playback Singer for the song "Manjal Prasadavum". Among the five songs in the film, three (except those sung by P. Jayachandran, who also played a role in the film) were composed in raga Mohanam.

Awards 
1986 National Film Awards (India)
 Won – National Film Award for Best Actress – Monisha
 Won – National Film Award for Best Female Playback Singer – K. S. Chithra for "Manjalprasadavum"

References

External links 

1980s Malayalam-language films
1986 films
1986 romantic drama films
Films directed by Hariharan
Films featuring a Best Actress National Award-winning performance
Films scored by Ravi
Films shot in Palakkad
Films shot in Thrissur
Films with screenplays by M. T. Vasudevan Nair
Indian romantic drama films
Malayalam films remade in other languages